Qaraqush (from the Turkic for 'Black Bird') may refer to:

 Qaraqush, Iran, a Turkic-populated village in Iran
 Baha al-Din Qaraqush (died 1201), commander under Saladin, regent of Egypt
 Sharaf al-Din Qaraqush (died 1212), Ayyubid commander and adventurer in North Africa

See also
 Karakuş